Veterans Aid is a UK charity providing support to ex-servicemen and women (Royal Navy, Royal Marines, Army, RAF or Merchant Navy), and their widows and widowers.

It operates from two locations: a Drop-in Centre/Head Office in central London (Victoria) and a residential home (New Belvedere House) in east London (Stepney).

The charity's core business is averting and/or addressing the crisis, particularly where it threatens to lead to homelessness.

History
Veterans Aid was established in 1932 (designated originally as EFC – The Embankment Fellowship Centre) as a direct response to the homelessness caused by poverty and unemployment among the ex-service community in London.

It was founded by Mrs Gwendoline Huggins, whose husband was Adjutant of The Royal Hospital Chelsea from 1932–35. Moved by the sight of men who had served their country sleeping on the capital’s streets and along the Thames Embankment, she decided to do something practical to remedy it. This led to the opening in January 1932 of  H10, a canteen and recreation room for destitute ex-services personnel in Lambeth, South London.

In 2007 the charity was renamed Veterans Aid, and its remit extended from homelessness to all issues affecting veterans in crisis.

The charity's patron is the Dowager Viscountess Rothermere.

Main activities 
In general terms, all the charity’s activities revolve around helping ex-servicemen and women in crisis. Specifically, it deals with all the factors that contribute to the crisis, especially those leading to homelessness. Because homelessness is considered both a cause and an effect of dysfunction, charitable activities are diverse. The charity aims to restore veterans in crisis to a point where they can sustain productive, independent living.

The charity aims to tackle rough sleeping by committing to 'No First Night Out. The charity will immediately provide food, new clothing and safe accommodation to those seeking and qualifying for its help.

Subsequent interventions can include counselling, addiction treatment and rehabilitation, debt management and, where appropriate, access to education, retraining or the acquisition of a new skill. Help is given to identify employment opportunities and, when veterans are considered ready, help is provided to source appropriately decorated and furnished homes.

See also
 Military Covenant
 Homelessness

References

Homelessness charities in the United Kingdom
British veterans' organisations
1932 establishments in the United Kingdom
Organizations established in 1932